Kaive Parish is an administrative unit of Cēsis Municipality in the Vidzeme region of Latvia. It is one of the 21 parishes in this municipality. Before the administrative reform of 2009, Kaive Parish was part of the former Cēsis District.

Towns, villages and settlements of Kaive Parish 

Parishes of Latvia
Cēsis Municipality
Vidzeme